The black antbird (Cercomacroides serva) is a species of passerine bird in the family Thamnophilidae. It is found in Bolivia, Brazil, Colombia, Ecuador, and Peru. Its natural habitat is subtropical or tropical moist lowland forests.

The black antbird was described by the English zoologist Philip Sclater in 1858 and given the binomial name Pyriglena serva. It was formerly included in the genus Cercomacra but when a molecular phylogenetic study published in 2014 found that Cercomacra was polyphyletic, the genus was split to create two monophyletic genera and six species including the black antbird were moved to the newly erected genus Cercomacroides.

References

black antbird
Birds of the Amazon Basin
Birds of Ecuador
Birds of Peru
black antbird
black antbird
Taxonomy articles created by Polbot